Legacy is an American western drama series starring Brett Cullen which aired on UPN for eighteen episodes from 1998 to 1999. The series is set on a Kentucky horse farm soon after the American Civil War. Cullen's character of Ned Logan is the 42-year-old widowed patriarch of the family. The series focuses on domestic and romantic crises, such as the arrival of 17-year-old orphan Jeremy, and Sean Logan's interracial affair with the daughter of a former slave.

Overview
A family-run horse farm nestled among the rolling bluegrass country provides the picturesque backdrop for Legacy, a family drama series that chronicles the proud and close-knit Logan family as they struggle to maintain their deep-seated family values of hard work and integrity in a society increasingly driven by money, power, and self-indulgence.

My grandfather came to this country 100 years ago and built an incredible life for his family out of nothing.  This land means everything to us...  He left us a legacy – to give others less fortunate than we are a chance to turn their lives around." – Ned Logan.

In Legacy, Ned seeks to pass on the "legacy" of his Irish ancestors – to build a solid foundation of love and support for his family while giving others less fortunate a chance to make better lives for themselves. Beyond stables of horses and acres of farmland, Ned must keep sight of his family, whose lofty ambitions, romantic entanglements, and mischievous adventures ensure the Logans notoriety within social circles.  Eldest son Sean (Grayson McCouch) is a handsome, charismatic young man with a promising future and a secret love that could threaten his dreams; Clay (Jeremy Vincent Garrett), the passionate, yet hot-tempered son, who often feels that his father's compassion for others does not extend to him; Alice (Lea Moreno), an upright and conflicted teenager forced by her mother's death to play the maternal role in  the family, but still searching for her own identity; and Lexy (Sarah Rayne), the youngest and most willful of the offspring, who often demonstrates wisdom beyond her years.

Adding drama to the family's already delicate balance is Jeremy (Ron Melendez), a street-wise and troubled 17 year-old orphan from New York who is taken in by Ned Logan.  With a history of dishonesty and petty crime, Jeremy finds himself a fish out of water as he builds both relationships and rifts with the rest of the family.

Cast

Main 
Brett Cullen as Ned Logan
Jeremy Garrett as Clay Logan
Sharon Leal as Marita Peters
Grayson McCouch as Sean Logan
Ron Melendez as Jeremy Bradford
Lea Moreno as Alice Logan
Sarah Rayne as Lexy Logan

Recurring 
Lisa Sheridan as Vivian Winters
Steven Williams as Isaac Peters
Sean Bridgers as William Winters
Mark Joy as Col. Harry Griffith
Casey Biggs as John Haden Turner
Brigid Brannagh as Molly

Episodes

Production
Though set near Lexington, Kentucky, Legacy was filmed by Atlantis Films Limited near Charles City, Virginia. The theme song for the series is from "The Mummers' Dance" by Loreena McKennitt.

Awards and nominations

References

External links
 
 

1990s American drama television series
1998 American television series debuts
1999 American television series endings
Television series by Alliance Atlantis
Television shows set in Kentucky
UPN original programming
1990s Western (genre) television series
Television shows set on farms